"To a Southern Slaveholder" is an anti-slavery essay written by the Unitarian minister Theodore Parker in 1848, as the abolition crisis was heating up in the United States.

The tone of the essay is akin to that of someone correcting someone else about a fact they got wrong. However, Parker says several times throughout that is not trying to antagonize slave owners and that he is their friend.

Parker points out flaws in the proslavery idea that slavery is allowed by the Bible. He argues that African Americans are not descendants of Noah's son Ham, who was cursed by his father to be a slave, as anti-abolitionists claimed. Parker goes further to say that even though the Old Testament does allow slavery, the creation of the New Testament ended such clauses.

References

External links

1848 essays
American essays
Slave narratives
Works about American slavery
Abolitionism in the United States